Adei Ad is an Israeli outpost in the West Bank. Located near Shvut Rachel and Qusra, it falls under the jurisdiction of the Mateh Binyamin Regional Council. A resident of Adei Ad says that the outpost includes about 40 families. Adei Ad gained international attention in January 2015, when residents allegedly engaged in throwing rocks at a delegation from the U.S. embassy.

The international community considers Israeli settlements in the West Bank illegal under international law, but the Israeli government disputes this.

History
Adei Ad was established in 1998 by a group of students at the Sdot Amir yeshiva in Shvut Rachel. It is named after a Bible verse from Psalm 132:14: "This is my resting place for ever and ever."

In 1999 Israeli Prime Minister Ehud Barak ordered the outpost dismantled. It was established on land privately owned by Palestinians and was therefore considered illegal even under Israeli law, although the ownership was disputed by the settlers.  In 2003 the Israeli High Court of Justice ruled that the land was owned by the state of Israel. The Israeli government, however, claimed that, despite its being state-owned, the settlers had no right to build there.

In June 2003 the Israeli Defense Forces (IDF) deployed paratroopers to blockade Adei Ad while it was dismantled. An IDF officer asked to be excused from participating in the blockade and was advised by his commanding officer that he could participate indirectly by briefing other soldiers involved in the operation. He refused this order as well and was subsequently jailed.  The High Court of Justice temporarily enjoined this dismantling operation and Binyamin Regional Council leader Pinhas Wallerstein accused the Israeli government of scheduling the dismantling of the outpost to coincide with a visit to Israel of U.S. Secretary of State Condoleezza Rice in order to show its commitment to the ongoing peace process.

Israeli news sources reported in 2003 that although the Israeli government was following its policy of dismantling them, it was simultaneously funding the construction of illegal outposts, including Adei Ad.

Adei Ad was the beneficiary of agricultural aid from Mishmeret Yesha, which by 2008 had cleared large areas of land around the outpost and planted thousands of dunams of grapevines.

In July 2008 soldiers from the IDF demolished an illegal structure in Adei Ad.  This led to retaliatory attacks on the IDF by settlers, which prompted the IDF Central Command to prohibit Israeli cars from entering parts of the West Bank for two days to prevent militant right-wing Israelis from joining in the violence.  The IDF accused the then mayor of Kedumim, Daniella Weiss, of orchestrating and encouraging the settler violence.

In July 2009 soldiers from the IDF demolished a single caravan in Adei Ad, prompting settlers from Kedumim to attack the IDF with stones, injuring one. Five settlers were arrested in this incident. Retaliation for the home demolitions continued with further incidents of rock throwing and the burning of Palestinian-owned olive trees.

In January 2015, settlers at what Haaretz referred to as the Adei Ad "illegal outpost" threw stones at diplomats from a U.S. delegation who had arrived to inspect vandalism reported at a grove of Palestinian-owned trees in the occupied West Bank. It was reported that Jewish settlers from the outpost were suspected of uprooting thousands of olive tree saplings, some of which had been planted in honor of senior Palestinian official Ziad Abu Ein, who collapsed and died after an altercation with an Israeli soldier. The American consulate came to inspect the grove because some of the land owners claim U.S. citizenship. This is the first known physical attack by Israelis against American diplomatic staff.

There is a plan to make Adei Ad part of Amihai, thereby legalizing the outpost. This is a highly controversial plan, which according to both critics and advocates, will result in the effective severance of West Bank's territorial contiguity, specifically between Central West Bank (Ramallah and Jerusalem) and Northern West Bank (Nablus, Jenin, etc.). This would have the effect of undermining the prospects of the realization of the Two-state solution.

Population
As of July 2009 the population of Adei Ad was about 20 settler families.

References

Israeli settlements in the West Bank
Populated places established in 1998
Mateh Binyamin Regional Council
2008 in the Palestinian territories
2009 in the Palestinian territories
2015 in the State of Palestine
Israeli outposts
Unauthorized Israeli settlements